Eupithecia tutsiana is a moth in the family Geometridae. It is found in Rwanda.

References

Moths described in 2001
tutsiana
Moths of Africa